The Social Science Open Access Repository (SSOAR) is a database specialising in scholarly articles from the social sciences which is freely accessible on the Internet.

SSOAR is a full-text server, and Internet users can access full-text versions of documents free of charge and without prior registration. The repository follows the so-called "Green Road", a strategy for the implementation of Open Access whereby preprints or postprints of scholarly contributions are archived in an openly accessible repository in addition to being published in toll-access journals etc.
 
Because the project is coordinated by an editorial team and is supported by an advisory board made up of members of scholarly societies, the quality of the contributions is assured.

Moreover, SSOAR offers authors the opportunity to self-archive their texts, to make them freely accessible and, by so doing, to increase the visibility and reach of their  work. The project is funded by the German Research Foundation (DFG).

External links
 

German digital libraries
Open-access archives
Discipline-oriented digital libraries
Full-text scholarly online databases